Rana Gharami (born 6 October 1990) is an Indian professional footballer who plays as a defender for SC East Bengal in the Indian Super League.

Career

Youth
Rana, resident of Garalgacha, joined a local football coaching camp where he brushed up his skills at an early age. He later joined Uttarpara Netaji Brigade. He was part of the U-21 West Bengal football team that won the Gold medal in the 2011 National Games under the coaching of Sankar Moitra.

Club
Rana joined CFL Premier Division  Club Peerless in 2010, moving to CFL Super Division side Railway FC the next season. In 2012–13 season, he played for I-League 2nd Division club Kalighat Milan Sangha.

For 2013-14 season Rana signed for I-League club Mohun Bagan. He failed to get any game time with the club and rejoined Kalighat Milan Sangha at the end of the season. In mid 2015 Rana was signed by Mohammedan SC for upcoming Calcutta Football League and 2015–16 I-League 2nd Division. He had a good 2016–17 season, in which Mohammedan won 2016 Sikkim Gold Cup and finished runners–up in 2016–17 Calcutta Premier Division. Adding to that he captained the West Bengal football team which won the 2016–17 Santosh Trophy.

In June 2017 Mohammedan extended Rana's contract till end of the 2017–18 Calcutta Premier Division. At the end of 2017–18 Calcutta Premier Division, Rana was signed by Mohun Bagan for upcoming I-League. With Mohun Bagan, Rana won the Sikkim Gold Cup once again.
He made his I-League debut on 10 December 2017 against Churchill Brothers coming in as
substitute in place of Ansumana Kromah at 65th minute of the match.

Awards
Rana received a special award from Calcutta Sports Journalists Club(CSJC) for his contributions for state team and the club in 2016-17 season at CSJC's annual awards.

Career statistics

Honours

Club
Mohammedan
 Sikkim Gold Cup : 2016
Mohun Bagan
 Sikkim Gold Cup : 2017

State
West Bengal
 Santosh Trophy : 2016–17
West Bengal Under–21
 National Games (Gold) : 2011

References

External links 
 
 

1990 births
Living people
Indian footballers
Footballers from West Bengal
Association football defenders
I-League 2nd Division players
I-League players
Mohammedan SC (Kolkata) players
Mohun Bagan AC players
Odisha FC players
East Bengal Club players
Indian Super League players